Hasubanan is an alkaloid with the chemical formula of C16H21N.  It forms the central core of a class of alkaloids known collectively as hasubanans.  The compound is derived from reticuline, as is morphinan, but is comparatively more oxidized and rearranged. It is similar to acutumine. 

Various alkaloids of this family have been synthesized in the laboratories.

See also
 Hasubanonine

References

External links
 Synthesis at chem.wisc.edu

Pyrrolidine alkaloids